Dorstenia tenuis is a species of herb in the plant family Moraceae which is native to southern South America.

References

tenuis
Flora of Argentina
Flora of Brazil
Flora of Paraguay
Flora of Uruguay
Vulnerable flora of South America
Plants described in 1873
Taxa named by Aimé Bonpland